John Michael Palms (born June 6, 1935, in Rijswijk, Netherlands) is an American military officer, nuclear physicist and college professor who also served as president of the University of South Carolina and Georgia State University.

Palms and his family left the Netherlands shortly after Germany invaded Poland, returned after the war, and then permanently immigrated to the United States in 1951, and became a naturalized citizen in 1957. Palms is married to Norma Cannon Palms, LHD (Hon) University of South Carolina (1958). They have three children.

Palms' career has been in academia, national security, business and volunteerism. He graduated from The Citadel in 1958 as a distinguished Air Force ROTC cadet and received a regular commission in the United States Air Force. He was first posted to Emory University where he received a master's degree in physics. Then, as a nuclear weapon officer, he was stationed at Kirtland Air Force Base, New Mexico working at Los Alamos National Laboratory, Lawrence Livermore National Laboratory and Sandia National Labs; he was also a professor of physics at the United States Air Force Academy. After his military service he received a PhD in physics from the University of New Mexico then joined the faculty at Emory University where he served for twenty-three years moving from an assistant professor to the university's chief academic officer; he also held the Charles Howard Chandler Chaired Professorship of Radiation and Environmental Physics. He was a member of the National Nuclear Accreditation Board and the Advisory Council for the National Academy of Nuclear Training of the Institute for Nuclear Power Operations. He also was a co-head of the team who designed the public assisted Ecological Based Environmental Radiation Monitoring Programs after the Three Mile Island accident. In 2001, the North American Technical Center Board chose him The Radiation Protection Professional of the Year. After moving from Emory to Georgia State University as president for two years, he moved to be president of the University of South Carolina in Columbia. After serving in that capacity for almost twelve years, he assumed his role as distinguished professor for five more years retiring in 2007. He has published over sixty scientific and technical papers and reports.

His business experience includes serving for twenty-one years on the boards of Exelon Corporation, the largest nuclear utility with nineteen nuclear power plants and on the board of Assurant Corporation where he has served as chairman from 2006 to 2011. Other public corporate boards include The Geo Group, one of the largest public prison companies in the world and Computer Task Group, (an information technology company). His national security service includes serving as a board member and chairman of the Institute for Defense Analyses, a federally funded research and development not for profit agency which advises the Secretary of Defense and undersecretaries and other federal agencies, including the National Institutes of Health, National Science Foundation, the Office of Science and Technology (serving the President's science advisor) and the Department of Energy. He currently serves as a MENTOR to IDA's Defense Science Study Group.

His volunteer work involves his membership in the Catholic Church as it relates to higher education. He and his wife, Norma, both received the Papal Honor Pro Ecclesia et Pontifice Cross from Pope Benedict XVI. He also received The Wisdom Award from Mepkin Abbey, Cistercian Trappists Monastery. He serves on the board of the Nederland American Foundation as chair of the Education Committee. The foundation among other programs between the Nederlands and the US supports Fulbright scholar exchanges between the two countries. He also supports numerous other volunteer organizations including Spoleto Festival USA, the United Way and The Citadel Advisory Committee for Math and Science. Palms and his wife donated $1 million to the Department of Religious Studies at the University of South Carolina.

Palms is a member of Phi Beta Kappa, he received the Emory faculty Thomas Jefferson Award. He served on the White House Fellows selection committee and chaired the Rhodes Scholar Selection Committee in Georgia and South Carolina. He holds honorary degrees from The Citadel (1990) and the University of South Carolina (2002) and received the Distinguished Alumni Award from the University of New Mexico (2003) and The Citadel (2009). He was awarded the State of South Carolina Order of the Palmetto in 2002. Exelon named a scholarship in his honor at Purdue University and Linn State Technical College; in 2012 the University of South Carolina named a building, The John M. Palms Center for Graduate Science Research, in his honor.

He currently is the president emeritus and distinguished professor emeritus at the University of South Carolina and resides in Charleston, South Carolina.

References

1935 births
Living people
21st-century American physicists
Presidents of the University of South Carolina
University of New Mexico alumni
The Citadel, The Military College of South Carolina alumni
Emory University alumni
United States Air Force Academy faculty
Emory University faculty
Georgia State University people
University of South Carolina faculty